Richmond University Medical Center is a hospital in West New Brighton, Staten Island, New York City. The hospital occupies the buildings that were formerly St. Vincent's Medical Center, which closed in 2006. It is affiliated with the Icahn School of Medicine at Mount Sinai and the Mount Sinai Health System.

History 
Richmond University Medical Center was established on January 1, 2007. It is a Level I Trauma Center located in Staten Island, New York. The original hospital on the site, St. Vincent's Hospital, was opened in 1903 as a 74-bed facility under the direction of the Sisters of Charity of New York in what had been the Garner mansion, a mansard-roofed stone building built by Charles Taber and later owned by W.T. Garner (the building had been offered to ex-President Ulysses S. Grant as a retirement home, but Grant and his wife were reportedly put off by a summer swarm of mosquitoes). 

The mansion still stands on the grounds. The hospital greatly expanded and modernized over the years, and the Sisters of Charity Healthcare System expanded to acquire the former U.S. Public Health Service Hospital in the Stapleton neighborhood of Staten Island, renaming it Bayley Seton Hospital. In 1999 Saint Vincent's Catholic Medical Center of Manhattan,  originally a separate institution founded by the same sisters, took control of the facility  as part of a major restructuring of the overall community of Catholic healthcare facilities  in New York. 

In 2006, St. Vincent's on Staten Island was sold to Bayonne Medical Center and spun off as Richmond University Medical Center (RUMC).

Although largely non-religiously affiliated, a cross that adorned St. Vincent's Hospital, on its main building, remains; another cross, on the Villa Building, has been removed.

Campuses
 355 Bard Avenue, Staten Island, New York 10310 (West Brighton)
 75 Vanderbilt Avenue, Staten Island, New York 10304 (Stapleton)

Number of beds
The hospital is licensed to operate 448 beds.
 Bed Type #
 Alcohol Detoxification 7
 Coronary Care 10
 Intensive Care 20
 Maternity 34
 Medical-Surgical 291
 Neonatal Continuing Care 6
 Neonatal Intensive Care 8
 Neonatal Intermediate Care 11
 Pediatric 23
 Pediatric Intensive Care Unit 3
 Psychiatric / Mental 35

Ownership
 Sisters of Charity Healthcare (1903–1999)
 Saint Vincent's Catholic Medical Center (1999–2007)
 Richmond University Medical Center (2007–present)

References

External links
Official website

Hospitals established in 2007
New York Medical College
Hospitals in Staten Island
Teaching hospitals in New York City
Trauma centers